The North Region of Singapore is one of the five regions in the city-state. The region is the second largest region in terms of land area, and has a population of 582,330. Woodlands is the regional centre and also the most populous town with 255,130 residents living in the area. Comprising 13,500 hectares of land area, it includes eight planning areas.

The relative isolation of the area from the Downtown Core meant relatively belated urban development and the greater abundance of natural greenery. Still, the region includes one of Singapore's largest new towns, Woodlands. Largely grouped into three new towns, it houses 129,000 residential housing units of various types, although public housing tends to dominate. Excluding naturally occurring green spaces, the region has 3 square kilometres of recreational spaces.

History

Planning strategies
Planning considerations for the Singapore Master Plan 2003 involving the North Region took into consideration its existing strengths. With a good mix of various housing types, the region also has established industrial areas particularly in Sungei Kadut and Senoko which provide for employment opportunities close to the residential areas. Transportation, which used to be considered difficult, has been improved tremendously with the completion of the Bukit Timah and Seletar Expressways, and the introduction of the Mass Rapid Transit's North South line. There are adequate commercial facilities with the siting of the Woodlands Regional Centre in the area, as well as recreational facilities. In addition, there is an abundance of green spaces, untouched forests, and even farmland, which are a rarity in Singapore today.

The burgeoning population in Singapore meant more space could be reserved for residential housing in the region. The newly built Sembawang New Town will expand northwards to the Senoko Industrial area. Another new town will be built in Simpang.

In terms of commercial needs, the Woodlands Regional Centre will be further developed. Large tracts of land remain awaiting potential development, with the potential of even taping into the market of residents in Johor Bahru, Malaysia, across the Strait of Johor. More industrial areas to meet employment needs are also planned for the region.

Given the large tracts of virgin forests within the region, care will be taken to protect and enhance them. New parks and park connectors are planned for, and a new sports complex will be built in Sembawang New Town. Facilities built for the new Republic Polytechnic campus may also be opened for public use.

Geography

Regime
The North Region is governed locally by the North West CDC and is divided into 8 planning areas.

Planning Areas

Economy

Sembawang Shipyard
Sembawang Shipyard is a shipyard that specialises in ship repairs and fabrication. Owned by SembCorp Marine, the shipyard has the deepest dry dock in Southeast Asia. Formerly a British naval base, the shipyard was built in 1938 as the Sembawang Naval Base. After Singapore's independence, the naval base was converted into a commercial shipyard under the management of Sembawang Corporation (now known as SembCorp).

Tourism
The region is home to several attractions, namely the Singapore Zoo, Night Safari and River Safari. In June 2016, it was announced that a  eco-tourism hub will be developed in Mandai. Together with the current zoological parks, the area will feature eco-friendly accommodations such as camps, tents, and family rooms. Jurong Bird Park will be relocated to the area, and the new bird park will be connected to a rainforest sanctuary, as part of the plan, with an expected completion date by 2020.

Education
Residents living within the area have access to different educational facilities ranging from preschools to primary and secondary schools, as these are located around the different towns in the East region. The area is also home to various tertiary institutions such as, Republic Polytechnic, Yishun Junior College and Innova Junior College and a special needs school, MINDS. There is also an international school, GEMS World Academy, located in Yishun.

References

External links
North Region, Singapore

 
Planning areas in Singapore
Regions of Singapore